The Mulawarman Museum is a museum in Tenggarong, East Kalimantan, Indonesia. It is located near the Mahakam River, in a former palace, constructed by the Dutch during the 1930s that was once the power base where 19 sultans reigned. The museum contains historical statues and antiquities, period furnishings, a richly adorned bedroom with hand-woven 'doyo' fabric, and items from the Ming, Qing and Yuan dynasties. The museum contains the Balinese puppet theatre, which was donated by the Sultan of Yogyakarta.

References

Museums in Kalimantan
Buildings and structures in East Kalimantan
Palaces in Kalimantan
History museums in Indonesia
Tourist attractions in East Kalimantan